Sikhism in Poland dates back mostly to the 1990s or early 2000s, during the immigration of Indians to Poland. There are about approximately 700 Sikhs in Poland, with the vast majority of them living in the capital of Warsaw.

Gurdwaras 
There is only one Gurdwara in Poland being stationed in Warsaw. The city's Sikh Gurdwara, called "Gurudwara Singh Sabha", is the only Sikh shrine in the whole of Eastern Europe and it is the place where both Sikhs and Sindhis come together to celebrate Baisakhi.

Controversy 
Sikhs in Poland are generally treated unfavourably by the locals, especially in more rural areas,  due to often being mistaken for Muslims for their usually darker skin, turban and beard.

One incident in 2015 involved a Sikh man, Navjot Sawhney, who was attacked by a bouncer outside a nightclub in Kraków because he looked like a "terrorist".

Sources 

Sikhism in Europe
Gurdwaras
Religion in Poland
Poland